J & W Van Duzen & Company, was a 19th-century, Philadelphia shipbuilding firm.  It was formed in 1834 by brothers John, Mathew and Washington Van Duzen and their brother-in-law Captain Christian Gulager.  The three sons of an earlier Philadelphia shipbuilder, Mathew Van Duzen who came from New York in 1795.

Washington Van Duzen patented the first marine railway in Philadelphia, in 1834.  It was subsequently built by J. & W. Van Dusen & Co., at Kensington, Philadelphia in 1834-35.

Mathew Van Dusen was mentor to Domingo Marcucci who later became an important early shipbuilder in San Francisco.

References

American companies established in 1834
Defunct shipbuilding companies of the United States
History of Philadelphia
Kensington, Philadelphia
1834 establishments in Pennsylvania